Alfred Moore Scales Law Office is a historic law office building located at Madison, Rockingham County, North Carolina. It was built in 1856, and moved to its present location in the 1920s. It is a one-story gable-roofed frame structure sheathed in plain weatherboarding.  It was the law office of Alfred Moore Scales, lawyer, American Civil War veteran, politician and governor of North Carolina from 1885–1890.

It was listed on the National Register of Historic Places in 1982.

See also 
 Brown-Cowles House and Cowles Law Office: NRHP listing in Wilkesboro, North Carolina
 Thomas B. Finley Law Office: NRHP listing in Wilkesboro, North Carolina
 Archibald Henderson Law Office: NRHP listing in Salisbury, North Carolina
 Nash Law Office: NRHP listing in Hillsborough, North Carolina
 Zollicoffer's Law Office: NRHP listing in Henderson, North Carolina
 National Register of Historic Places listings in Rockingham County, North Carolina

References

Office buildings on the National Register of Historic Places in North Carolina
Commercial buildings completed in 1856
Buildings and structures in Rockingham County, North Carolina
National Register of Historic Places in Rockingham County, North Carolina
Scales family
Law offices
Legal history of North Carolina
1856 establishments in Kentucky